Culex (Lophoceraomyia) bicornutus is a species of zoophilic mosquito belonging to the genus Culex. It is found in India, Sri Lanka, China, Japan, Malaysia, Myanmar, Thailand, and Vietnam.

References

External links 
Culicine mitochondrial genome sequences

bicornutus
Insects described in 1910